Eucraera koellikerii is a species of Lasiocampidae moth, it is known from Angola, Congo, Equatorial Guinea, Kenya, Mozambique, South Africa and Tanzania.

References
Dewitz, 1881. Afrikanische Nachtschmetterlinge. Nova acta Leopoldina Bd. 42, no. 2

External links

Lasiocampidae
Moths of Africa
Moths described in 1881